Kallifoni is a village and a former municipality in the Karditsa regional unit, Thessaly, Greece. Since the 2011 local government reform it is part of the municipality Karditsa, of which it is a municipal unit. The municipal unit has an area of 154.623 km2. Population 2,501 (2011).

References

Populated places in Karditsa (regional unit)